Irina Yarotska (also spelled Iryna, born August 29, 1985) is a Ukrainian female artistic gymnast. Yarotska was born in Kyiv, Ukraine and is coached by Ghalina Chieghimagha.

Career
She started gymnastics at age 6 and began her career as a senior elite gymnast at 16, in 2001. Irina Vladimirovna Yarotskaya (her full name in her native Ukrainian) won the bronze medal on the balance beam at the 2002 World Championships in Debrecen. She also placed fourth in the all-around at the 2003 World Championships in Anaheim, California and went on to win the gold for all around and silver with her team at the 2003 University Games. The following year, she was a member of the 2004 Ukrainian Olympic team, where she finished fourth with her team and sixth in the all-around. Following her retirement in 2005, she married Valeri Goncharov, a fellow Ukrainian Olympian and gold medalist on the parallel bars. She was known for her elegant lines and nice execution, as are many of the Ukrainian gymnasts.

Eponymous skill
Yarotska has one eponymous skill listed in the Code of Points.

See also
 List of Olympic female artistic gymnasts for Ukraine

References

External links
 
 
 

1985 births
Living people
Ukrainian female artistic gymnasts
Olympic gymnasts of Ukraine
Gymnasts at the 2004 Summer Olympics
Medalists at the World Artistic Gymnastics Championships
Universiade medalists in gymnastics
Gymnasts from Kyiv
Universiade gold medalists for Ukraine
Universiade silver medalists for Ukraine
Universiade bronze medalists for Ukraine
Medalists at the 2003 Summer Universiade
Originators of elements in artistic gymnastics
21st-century Ukrainian women